The Passionate Quest is a 1926 American drama film directed by J. Stuart Blackton and written by Marian Constance Blackton. It is based on the 1924 novel The Passionate Quest by E. Phillips Oppenheim. The film stars May McAvoy, Willard Louis, Louise Fazenda, Gardner James, Jane Winton and Holmes Herbert. The film was released by Warner Bros. on July 10, 1926.

Cast       
May McAvoy as Rosina Vonet
Willard Louis as Matthew Garner
Louise Fazenda as Madame Mathilde
Gardner James as Philip Garth
Jane Winton as The Leading Lady
Holmes Herbert as Erwen 
DeWitt Jennings as Benjamin Stone
Vera Lewis as Mrs. Gardner
Nora Cecil as Mrs. Flint
Frank Butler as Lord 'Reggie' Towers
Charles A. Stevenson as Rossil 
William Herford as Bone

References

External links

 

1926 films
1920s English-language films
Silent American drama films
1926 drama films
Warner Bros. films
Films directed by J. Stuart Blackton
American silent feature films
American black-and-white films
Films based on British novels
1920s American films